Visković is a surname. Notable people with the surname include:

 Ivo Visković (born 1949), Serbian diplomat of Croatian origin
 Josip Visković, Venetian count from the Bay of Kotor
  (born 1951), Croatian writer

See also
 Vasković
 Višković
 Fisković

Croatian surnames